The Killer Must Kill Again (Italian: L'assassino è costretto ad uccidere ancora) is a 1975 Italian giallo film directed by Luigi Cozzi. Cozzi originally wanted to call the film Il Ragno (The Spider) but it was changed to The Killer Must Kill Again by the producers. It is based on the novel Al mare con la ragazza (translation: By the Sea With the Girl) by Giorgio Scerbanenco. The film was also released as The Dark Is Death's Friend. Michel Antoine (who plays the killer in this film) later played the tortured painter in Lucio Fulci's The Beyond.

Plot  
Giorgio is a greedy adulterer who makes a deal with a serial killer (Michel Antoine) to dispose of his wealthy wife, Nora. Unfortunately, a thrill-seeking young couple steal the killer's car with Nora's corpse in the trunk, ending up at a run-down seaside villa. The killer follows their trail and eventually finds them, violently raping the young girl when he finds her alone, then he knocks our her boyfriend upon his return. Now the young girl is left to fend for herself against the merciless killer.

Cast  
George Hilton: Giorgio Mainardi
Antoine Saint-John: Killer (credited as Michel Antoine) 
Femi Benussi: Dizzy Blonde 
Cristina Galbó: Laura
Eduardo Fajardo: Inspector 
Tere Velázquez: Norma Mainardi
Alessio Orano: Luca

Critical reception 
AllMovie called the film "too erratic for the general horror audience", but "offers just enough suspense and style to please patient giallo fans."

References

External links 

 

1975 films
1970s psychological thriller films
Italian thriller films
Giallo films
Films based on works by Giorgio Scerbanenco
Films directed by Luigi Cozzi
Films based on Italian novels
1970s Italian films